Louis-Alphonse is a French given name. Notable people with the name include:
 Louis-Alphonse Boyer (1839–1916), Quebec merchant and political figure
 Louis Alphonse de Bourbon, pretender to the French throne
 Louis Alphonse de Brébisson, French botanist
 Louis-Alphonse de Valbelle, French bishop
 Louis Alphonse Gassion, French entertainer
 Louis Alphonse Koyagialo, Congolese politician

See also 
 Alphonse (disambiguation)

French masculine given names
Compound given names